Sainte-Clotilde-de-Beauce is a municipality located in the Municipalité régionale de comté des Appalaches in Quebec, Canada. It is part of the Chaudière-Appalaches region and the population is 569 as of 2021. It was named after Clotilde, Frankish queen and wife of Clovis I. "Beauce" refers to the municipality's former census division and helps to its differentiation with other Quebec municipalities named "Sainte-Clotilde."

Demographics
Population trend:
 Population in 2021: 569 (2011 to 2016 population change: 3.6%)
 Population in 2016: 549 (2011 to 2016 population change: -15.5%)
 Population in 2011: 650 
 Population in 2006: 601
 Population in 2001: 577
 Population in 1996: 583

Private dwellings occupied by usual residents: 233 (total dwellings: 261)

References

External links

Commission de toponymie du Québec
Ministère des Affaires municipales, des Régions et de l'Occupation du territoire

Municipalities in Quebec
Incorporated places in Chaudière-Appalaches